Choranalli is a village near Mysore city, Karnataka state, India.

Location
Choranahalli is a village in Mysuru district and is around just 11.5 km from the city centre. The village comes under Varuna Grama Panchayath and is surrounded by Chikkalli, Varuna, Janthagalli, Yandalli and Lalithadripura villages.

Demographics
Choranahalli village has a population of 2,213 people according to the 2011 census. There are 528 houses in the village.

Administration
The village is administered as part of Varuna Gram Panchayath which is again part of Mysore Taluk.

Education
 The village has a government school and offers primary education up to 7th standard.
 Eashwar Vidyalaya, Choranahalli.

See also
 Varuna Village
 Nadanahalli
 Sutturu

References

Suburbs of Mysore